Thomas Garth may refer to:

Thomas Garth (British Army officer) (1744–1829)
Thomas Garth (Royal Navy) (1787–1841)